Abraham Krotoshinsky (December 28, 1892 – November 24, 1953) was a United States Army soldier who received the Distinguished Service Cross in recognition of his actions as part of The Lost Battalion during the final weeks of World War I.

Early life
A son of Wolf Krotoshinsky, he was born in Plotsk, Poland, then part of the Russian Empire, and came to New York City in 1912 in order to escape service in the Russian Army. He initially worked as a barber
"I ran away from Russia and came to America to escape military service. I hated Russia, its people, its government, in particular its cruel and inhuman treatment of Jews. Such a Government I refused to serve. "

Military service
Krotoshinsky undertook initial training at Camp Upton, where he enjoyed his time in the Army. Shortly after his arrival in France, the 77th Division was sent to relieve the 42nd Division in the Lorraine, where the German Army sent up a welcome balloon which said "Goodbye, Forty-Second! Hello, Seventy-Seventh!. Shortly thereafter, the 77th was moved to near Château-Thierry, where it would part of the drive against Germany. Krotoshinsky passed a message, which led him to help rescue the trapped company. During this trip, he played dead and his hand was stepped on by a German officer. After the action he was awarded the Distinguished Service Cross by General John J. Pershing, the Commander-in-Chief of the American Expeditionary Forces (AEF). The citation for his DSC reads:

After the war

Krotoshinsky portrayed himself in the 1919 film, The Lost Battalion (1919).

Krotoshinsky, with the help of Nathan Strauss, emigrated to Palestine, but found that he did not have the capital to farm successfully. He described himself as a Zionist. After his return to the United States, he was in some difficulty, but eventually, in 1927, was given by an executive order from President Calvin Coolidge a job with the United States Postal Service, where he served at the 221 East Thirty-Fourth Street Post-office until his death on 4 November 1953, at the age of 60. He was survived by three daughters, Mrs. Abigail Krotoshinsky (née Arkin) - a foster daughter, a brother Joseph, and, currently, has many descendants.

Popular culture
He was portrayed by Arthur Kremer in the 2001 production of The Lost Battalion.

References

Jews from the Russian Empire
United States Army soldiers
People from the Bronx
Emigrants from the Russian Empire to the United States
Jewish American military personnel
1892 births
1953 deaths
American Zionists
Recipients of the Distinguished Service Cross (United States)
United States Postal Service people
Activists from New York (state)
United States Army personnel of World War I
20th-century American Jews
Burials in New Jersey
20th-century Polish military personnel